Alfonso Corona Blake (2 January 1919 – 21 January 1999) was a Mexican film director and screenwriter. He directed 27 films between 1956 and 1971. His film The Road of Life won the Honourable Mention (Director) award at the 6th Berlin International Film Festival.

Selected filmography
 The Road of Life (1956)
 Happiness (1957)
 El mundo de los vampiros (1961)
 Santo vs. las Mujeres Vampiro (1962)

References

External links

1919 births
1999 deaths
Ariel Award winners
Best Director Ariel Award winners
Mexican film directors
People from Autlán, Jalisco
Mexican people of Scottish descent
20th-century Mexican screenwriters
20th-century Mexican male writers